Enfield Creek is a river located in Tompkins County, New York. It flows into Cayuga Inlet by Ithaca, New York.

References

Rivers of Tompkins County, New York
Rivers of New York (state)